Quality Meat Scotland (QMS) is an executive non-departmental public body of the Scottish Government. It promotes the red meat sector and markets the Protected Geographical Indication Scotch Beef and Scotch Lamb brands.

It was set up in 1990 (originally as the Scottish Quality Beef & Lamb Association) to provide assurance to industry and consumers that animals produced for the food chain met certain standards.  It was established on a statutory basis in 2008, replacing the Meat and Livestock Commission.

Controversies 

In 2021, covert footage was shot at a high welfare farm owned by Philip Sleigh, the chairman of the pig standard-setting committee at Quality Meat Scotland. Footage showed farmers hammering pigs to death, weak piglets being slammed into concrete floors and pigs with severe untreated prolapses. Animal Equality UK said "Rubbing shoulders with government officials and accreditation reps, Philip Sleigh was entrusted with a position of power, yet his own farm breached the very standards he helped set".

References

External links
 
 Scotch Beef and Lamb
 Specially Selected Pork

Agriculture in Scotland
Farm assurance
Scottish cuisine
Executive non-departmental public bodies of the Scottish Government
Organisations based in Edinburgh
1999 establishments in Scotland
Government agencies established in 1999
Meat industry organizations
Brand name meats
Meat processing in the United Kingdom
Animals in Scotland